The Fontainebleau Agreements were a proposed arrangement between the France and the Vietminh, made in 1946 before the outbreak of the First Indochina War. The agreements affiliated Vietnam under the French Union. At the meetings, Ho Chi Minh pushed for Vietnamese independence but the French would not agree to this proposal.

When the Vietnamese government wrote a draft constitution without reference to the French, the latter attempted to regain control of French Indochina, contributing to the outbreak of the Indochina War.

See also

References 

First Indochina War
1946 in Vietnam